Dangerous Angels, also known as the Weetzie Bat series, is a young adult fiction series by Francesca Lia Block. The book consists of seven novels: Weetzie Bat, Witch Baby, Cherokee Bat and the Goat Guys, Missing Angel Juan, Baby Be-Bop, Necklace of Kisses, and Pink Smog: Becoming Weetzie Bat. The books describe the lives of the main character, Weetzie Bat, and her friends and family members who all live in Los Angeles. The books include supernatural elements such as witches, genies, and ghosts and can be described as magical realism or mythpunk.

The series title comes from the omnibus edition of the first five books, Dangerous Angels, first published in 1998. It was named after a quote from Weetzie Bat: "Love is a dangerous angel." [p. 11]  The omnibus was reissued in 2007 and again in 2010.

Plot summary
 Weetzie Bat (1989): Weetzie Bat meets her best friend Dirk, who identifies as gay, at school and together they have grand adventures around Los Angeles comforting each other when they get hurt on their quest to find their ducks or soul mates. Grandma Fifi gives Weetzie a genie lamp which gives her three wishes that are granted and their lives change forever with unforeseen ramifications.
 Witch Baby (1991): Witch Baby, a purple-eyed girl who lives with Weetzie Bat, My-Secret-Agent-Lover-Man, and the rest of the kin does not know where she belongs in the world. As she tires of tormenting her sister, Cherokee, Witch Baby happens to meet a boy Angel Juan who she instantly knows is her soul mate and through him realizes what a family should be. She goes on a quest to find her mother in hopes of finding out where she belongs, to find out that her mother does not care about her. In the end, she misses her family and realizes it is with them she belongs.
 Cherokee Bat and the Goat Guys (1992): The grown-ups in the family are off filming their new movie, leaving Cherokee to look after Witch Baby who has locked herself in the shed refusing to eat because she misses Angel Juan so desperately. To lure her out, Cherokee makes her a pair of wings, which transform Witch Baby. The girls decide to start a band with Angel Juan and Raphael, but when they go to perform they all freeze. Cherokee makes the rest of the band members magical items which makes them one of the hottest bands until they get caught up in the world of drugs, sex, and jealousy. Cherokee takes away the magical gifts after realizing what it has done to them, making them re-examine their choices.
 Missing Angel Juan (1993): Angel Juan left for New York City and Witch Baby is desperately missing him, and when he stops writing she knows something has happened to him. She goes in search of him staying at the apartment of Weetzie Bat’s deceased father, Charlie Bat, which happens to be haunted by him. Together the ghost of Charlie Bat and Witch Baby trace Angel Juan’s steps to a ‘man’ named Cake who she must rescue him from without getting herself captured as well.
 Baby Be-Bop (1995): A prequel to the other stories, it focuses on the journey of Dirk’s life before meeting Weetzie Bat. While living with Grandma Fifi in high school Dirk struggles with his sexuality and how to come out to Pup, his best friend and who he thinks is his soul mate. Though Pup feels the same he refuses to come out and starts dating a girl, leaving Dirk heartbroken. After being beaten up by a bunch of anti-gay people he crashes at home and starts dreaming of his ancestors, which helps him come to terms with who he is through their life stories.
Necklace of Kisses (2005): Disillusioned by adult life and passionless marriage, Weetzie Bat moves to LA's Pink Hotel to find herself. There, she meets a variety of supernatural characters and regains her passion for life.
Pink Smog (2012): This prequel novel describes Weetzie Bat's life as a pre-teen when she was still known as Louise Bat.

Major themes
The major theme throughout all of the stories making up Dangerous Angels is “tolerance through love.” 
Individual stories have more individualized themes etched within them. Cherokee Bat and the Goat Guys are about the importance of loved ones and the natural and spiritual worlds.
Witch Baby’s magical story is about the “danger of denying life's pain.” 
Weetzie Bat is a transcendent coming-of-age story. The strong theme of Missing Angel Juan Cart states best as, “love, in its infinite varieties, is both humankind's natural estate and heart-magic strong enough to redeem any loss.” 
In Baby Be-Bop the theme is finding love for oneself and is “a safety net of words for readers longing to feel at home with themselves.”

Literary significance and reception
All of the short books that are combined to make Dangerous Angels received great reviews when they were published. Osborn says of Weetzie Bat, “Weetzie and her friends live like the lilies of the field, yet their responsibility to each other and their love for the baby show a sweet grasp of the realities that matter.” Block manages to bring the most important things in life, family and love to the front of the novel making other life matters secondary, which readers find enchanting. In 2005 Block received the Margaret A. Edwards Award, “for outstanding contributions to young adult readers”, for the Weetzie Bat books.

Baby Be-Bop controversy
In June 2009, Block's book Baby Be-bop, which deals with the life of a gay teenager, was part of a controversy in West Bend, Wisconsin, where several parents' groups insisted that the book, among others, be removed from the local public library and publicly burned.

Awards

References

1998 American novels
American young adult novels
Novels by Francesca Lia Block
Novels set in Los Angeles
LGBT speculative fiction novels
Young adult novel series
American LGBT novels